C. J. Sanders (born September 18, 1996) is an American football wide receiver, and a former child actor. Sanders has had acting roles in several Hollywood movies and television shows.

High school
Sanders attended Brentwood Academy in Brentwood, Tennessee for his first three seasons. After moving to California with his family, he transferred to Notre Dame High School, Sherman Oaks, California for his senior year. Sanders had 35 catches for 562 yards and eight touchdowns. He also carried the ball 41 times for 437 yards for nine touchdowns. On special teams, he added four total touchdowns, including two on kickoffs and two on punts.

Considered a four-star recruit by Rivals.com, he was rated as the 37th best wide receiver prospect of his class. He accepted a scholarship offer and committed to play college football at the University of Notre Dame.

Acting career
Sanders was an American child actor whose notable roles include the movie Ray, where he played a young Ray Charles, and the television show Six Feet Under, where he played Anthony Charles-Fisher in a number of episodes. He also played in the movie First Sunday as Ice Cube's son Durell, Jr.

He was nominated for several awards for his performance in Ray, including a Black Reel Award, an NAACP Image Award, an OFTA Award, and a Young Artist Awards. He also guest starred in a few television shows, such as Judging Amy, Cold Case, Grey's Anatomy and Saved.

College career

Freshman
A standout in summer practices, Sanders was named the starting punt returner for Notre Dame and later took over kick return duties as well.

Sanders emerged as a standout in his special teams role. Against UMass, Sanders returned a punt 50 yards for a touchdown in just his fourth collegiate game. Later in the season, Sanders returned a kickoff 93 yards for a touchdown against Stanford.

Personal
C.J.'s father is former NFL wide receiver Chris Sanders. His step-father, Corey Harris, is former safety who played 12 
seasons in the NFL. CJ Sanders mom Stacie McCall Harris was a point guard at the University of Michigan.

C.J. has his own non-profit organization, CJ's Gift Foundation, whose mission is to "promote self-esteem and self-worth among disadvantaged and at risk youth and their parents" and "to purposefully seek-out and reach-out to families who have been forgotten, overlooked and left out of opportunities that produce positive change and inspire hope."

References

External links
CJ’s Gift Foundation

SMU Mustangs bio

1996 births
Living people
African-American male actors
American football wide receivers
American male child actors
American male film actors
American male television actors
Male actors from Los Angeles
Notre Dame Fighting Irish football players
Notre Dame High School (Sherman Oaks, California) alumni
People from Granada Hills, Los Angeles
Players of American football from Los Angeles
SMU Mustangs football players
21st-century African-American people